Aetomylaeus is a genus of eagle rays in the family Myliobatidae.

Species
There are currently 8 recognized species in this genus: 

The recognized extinct species:

† Aetomylaeus cojimarensis ITURRALDE-VINENT, MORA, ROJAS & GUTIERREZ, 1998 
† Aetomylaeus cubensis ITURRALDE-VINENT, MORA, ROJAS & GUTIERREZ, 1998

References

 
Ray genera
Taxa named by Samuel Garman
Extant Pliocene first appearances
Taxonomy articles created by Polbot